Nomotettix cristatus, known generally as crested pygmy grasshopper, is a species of pygmy grasshopper in the family Tetrigidae. Other common names include the crested grouse locust and northern crested grouse locust. It is found in North America.

Subspecies
These three subspecies belong to the species Nomotettix cristatus:
 Nomotettix cristatus compressus Morse, 1895
 Nomotettix cristatus cristatus (Scudder, 1862)
 Nomotettix cristatus floridanus Hancock, 1902

References

Tetrigidae
Articles created by Qbugbot
Insects described in 1863